{{DISPLAYTITLE:C18H17N3O2}}
The molecular formula C18H17N3O2 (molar mass: 307.35 g/mol) may refer to:

 para-Aminoblebbistatin
 Anitrazafen
 Orteronel

Molecular formulas